John Englehardt Homestead is a historic home located at Upper Frederick Township, Montgomery County, Pennsylvania.  It was built in three sections between 1725 and about 1850.  The oldest part is a -story, stone dwelling, with two-bay Germanic style front facade.  A -story, Georgian style, five-bay-wide stone section was added about 1800.  The third section was built in the mid-19th century, and is a -story, frame structure.  Also on the property is a contributing Swiss bank barn.

It was added to the National Register of Historic Places in 1973.

Gallery

References

German-American culture in Pennsylvania
Houses on the National Register of Historic Places in Pennsylvania
Georgian architecture in Pennsylvania
Houses completed in 1850
Houses in Montgomery County, Pennsylvania
Swiss-American culture in Pennsylvania
National Register of Historic Places in Montgomery County, Pennsylvania
Upper Frederick Township, Montgomery County, Pennsylvania